Mirrabooka may refer to:
Mirrabooka, New South Wales
Mirrabooka, Western Australia